Tatiana Larionova (born 2 July 1955, Kazan) is a Russian political figure and deputy of the 8th State Duma. In 2005, she was granted a Candidate of Sciences in Sociology degree.

From 1983 to 1991, she worked in the Communist Party of the Soviet Union as an instructor, deputy head, head of the propaganda and agitation department, and second secretary of the Volga Federal District committee in Kazan. In 1991, Larionova started working in the Kazan city administration. From 2001 to 2006, he was the Head of the Department of Social Protection of the Ministry of Labour, Employment and Social Protection of the Republic of Tatarstan. In November 2006, she was appointed state advisor to President of the Republic of Tatarstan Mintimer Shaimiev. From 2014 to 2021, she was the deputy of the State Council of the Republic of Tatarstan of the 5th and 6th convocations. Since September 2021, she has served as deputy of the 8th State Duma from the Tatarstan constituency.

Awards  
 Order "For Merit to the Fatherland"

References

1955 births
Living people
United Russia politicians
21st-century Russian politicians
21st-century Russian women politicians
Eighth convocation members of the State Duma (Russian Federation)
Kazan Federal University alumni
Politicians from Kazan